Chongos Bajo District is one of nine districts of the province Chupaca in Peru.

References